Peter Eich (born 18 June 1963) is a German former footballer who played as a goalkeeper for SV Waldhof Mannheim, FC 08 Homburg and 1. FC Saarbrücken.

References

External links

1963 births
Living people
People from Bad Kreuznach
German footballers
Footballers from Rhineland-Palatinate
Association football goalkeepers
2. Bundesliga players
BFV Hassia Bingen players
SV Waldhof Mannheim players
FC 08 Homburg players
1. FC Saarbrücken players